The 2005 All-Ireland Senior Camogie Championship Final was the 74th All-Ireland Final and the deciding match of the 2005 All-Ireland Senior Camogie Championship, an inter-county camogie tournament for the top teams in Ireland.

Tipp led 1-10 to 0-8 at half-time, but Cork persistence, as well as an Una O'Dwyer own goal, gave them victory in the end.

References

All-Ireland Senior Camogie Championship Final
All-Ireland Senior Camogie Championship Final
All-Ireland Senior Camogie Championship Final, 2005
All-Ireland Senior Camogie Championship Finals
Cork county camogie team matches
Tipperary county camogie team matches